Daughters of Light: Quaker Women Preaching and Prophesying in the Colonies and Abroad, 1700-1775 is a book by Rebecca Larson, published in 1999. It provides specific studies of 18th century women ministers, evidencing the progressive nature of Quaker views on women.

Author
Rebecca Larson was born in 1959. She has a BA at the University of California, Santa Barbara and a Ph.D. at Harvard University. At the time of publication, she lived in Santa Barbara

Content
In addition to the text, the book contains an appendix giving individual descriptions of the transatlantic Ministers, of about 10-15 lines on each person:

Alice (Burton) Alderson (1678-1766):
Elizabeth (Sampson) (?) (Sullivan) Ashbridge (1713-1755):
Sarah (Payton) (Clarke) Baker (1669-1714): 
Mary (Hogsflesh) Bannister (fl.. 1703)
Barbara Bevan (1682-1705)
Jane (Boid) (Atkinson) Biles (d. 1709)
Esther (Palmer) Champion (1678-1714)
Esther (Peacock) Clare (ca. 1675-1742)
Comfort (Stanyan) (Hoag) CoIIins (1711-1816)
Hannah (Dent) Cooper (d. 1754)
Margaret Copeland (1684-1759)
Jane (Rowlandson) Crosfield (1712-1784
Phebe (Willets) (Mott) Dodge (1699-1782)
Mary (?) Ellerton (d. 1736)
Margaret Ellis (d. 1765 in old age)
Alice (Featherstone) Hall (1708-1762)
Eliphal (Smith) (Perry) Harper (d. 1747):
Hannah (Featherstone) Harris (1708-1786)
Rebecca (Owen) (Minshall) Harvey (b. 1687-fl. 1751)
Jane (Fenn) Hoskins (1694-1764):
Sophia (Wigington) Hume (1702-1774)
Mary (Goodwin) James (d. ca. 1776)
Elizabeth (?) Kay (d. 1713)
Mary (Ransome) Kirby (1709-1779)
Mary (Payne) Leaver (1720-1789)
Margaret (Thomas) Lewis (1712-1789)
Susanna (Hudson) (Hatton) Lightfoot (1720-1781)
Ann (Herbert) Moore (1710-1783)
Elizabeth  (Roberts) Morgan (1688-1777)
Elizabeth (Hudson) Morris (1722-1783)
Sarah Morris (1703-1775)
Susanna (Heath) Morris (1682-1755)
Mary (Peisley) Neale (1717-1757)
Esther (Palmer) Champion (1678-1714)
Esther (Peacock) Clare (ca. 1675-1742)
Comfort (Stanyan) (Hoag) Collins (1711-1816)
Sarah (Clements) Owen (fl. 1703)
Ann (Chapman) Parsons (1676-1732)
Mary (Morgan) Pennell (1678-1764)
Catharine (Payton) Phillips (1726-1794)
Elizabeth (Beck) Rawlinson (1670-1750)
Ann (Lewis) (Williams) (Bennett) Roberts (1678-1750)
Mary (Wheeler) Rogers (d. 1699)
Elizabeth (Levis) Shipley (1690-1777)
Ann (Waln) (Dillworth) Sibthorp (1654-1710)
Elizabeth Smith (1724-1772)
Margaret (Paine) Stones (d. 1740)
Rebecca (England) Turner (d. 1721)
Mary (Hayes) (Lewis) Waln (d. 1753)
Mary (Pace) Waring (1712-1776)
Abigail (Craven) (Boles) Watson (1684-1752)
Elizabeth Webb (1663-1727)
Elizabeth (Duckworth) Whartnaby (d. 1734)
Esther (Canby) (Stapler) White (1700-1777)
Elizabeth (Scot) Wilkinson (1712-1771)
Rachel (Wilson) Wilson (1720-1775)
Sarah (Goodwin) Worrell (d. 1775)

Reviews
The Pennsylvania Magazine of History and Biography, Vol. 124, No. 3,(July, 2000), pp. 437-439: Review by Jean R Soderlund (Subscription access)
William & Mary Quarterly Vol. 59 No. 2 (April 2001)-taster of first 3 paragraphs - subscription needed for whole article)
Collection of short reviews of this book in DC Public Library online

References

1999 non-fiction books
20th-century history books
History books about Christianity
History books about the United States
History books about the United Kingdom
Religious biographical dictionaries
British biographical dictionaries
United States biographical dictionaries
British Quaker texts
Quaker ministers
History of Quakerism
1999 in Christianity